Dávid Barczi (born 1 February 1989, is a Hungarian midfielder who currently plays for III. Kerületi TVE.

Honours
Diósgyőr
Hungarian League Cup (1): 2013–14

Club statistics

Updated to games played as of 15 May 2021.

External links
 Player profile at HLSZ 
 

1989 births
Living people
People from Siófok
Hungarian footballers
Association football midfielders
Újpest FC players
Diósgyőri VTK players
Fehérvár FC players
Vasas SC players
Zalaegerszegi TE players
Mezőkövesdi SE footballers
III. Kerületi TUE footballers
Nemzeti Bajnokság I players
Nemzeti Bajnokság II players
Sportspeople from Somogy County